Franklin Alexander Van Dyke (born July 24, 1974) is a former American football wide receiver who was selected by the New York Jets in the 2nd round (31st overall) of the 1996 NFL Draft. He played collegiately at the University of Nevada, Reno and five years in the National Football League (NFL) for the Jets and Philadelphia Eagles from 1996 to 2000.  He currently owns and operates a training facility in Sacramento, California.

College career
Van Dyke was a two-time All-American, winning the Big West Conference Offensive Player of the Year in 1995 by leading the nation in receiving yards per game (168.6) and receptions per game (11.7).
 1994: 98 catches for 1,246 yards and 10 TD.
 1995: 129 catches for 1,854 yards and 16 TD.

See also
 List of NCAA major college football yearly receiving leaders

References

See also
List of NCAA Football records

1974 births
Living people
Players of American football from Sacramento, California
American football wide receivers
Nevada Wolf Pack football players
New York Jets players
Philadelphia Eagles players
Sacramento City Panthers football players